Athie may refer to:

Athie (surname), a surname
Athie, Côte-d'Or, a commune in the department of Côte-d'Or
Athie, Yonne, a commune in the department of Yonne

See also 
 Athies (disambiguation)